Iteomyia is a genus of gall midges in the family Cecidomyiidae.

Species
 Iteomyia capreae (Winnertz, 1853)
 Iteomyia major (Kieffer, 1889)
 Iteomyia peyerimhofi  (Kieffer, 1909)
 Iteomyia salicifolia (Felt, 1910)
 Iteomyia salicisverruca (Osten Sacken, 1878)

References

External links

Cecidomyiinae
Gall-inducing insects
Insects described in 1913
Taxa named by Jean-Jacques Kieffer
Bibionomorpha genera